Wraith was a hard rock band formed in Nottingham, UK, in 1987. It was initially signed to Warhammer Records. It was made up of five members.

History 
The band released its sixth album, Revelation, in 2017.

Discography
"Lonely" (single, 1987)
Naked Aggression (EP, 1989)
Danger Calling (1992)
Riot (1993)
Cursed (EP, 1993)
Schizophrenia (1996)
Evolution (2006)
Revelation (2017)

References 

British hard rock musical groups
Musical groups from Nottingham
Musical groups established in 1987